Women's gridiron football (including American football and Canadian football) is a form of the sport played by women. Most leagues in the United States, such as the Women's Football Alliance, play by rules similar to men's tackle football. Although women's flag football is emerging as a collegiate sport, women playing gridiron football at the college level have historically joined men's teams, often (though not exclusively) as placekickers.

The following is a list of some of the most notable female American football players.

Players in predominantly male football leagues 
 Patricia Palinkas – First woman to play professional football, debuting on August 15, 1970, as a holder for her placekicker husband on the Orlando Panthers of the minor-league Atlantic Coast Football League. She played two games in the preseason but left after Steve Palinkas was injured and cut from the team.
 Abby Vestal – First woman to score points in a men's professional football game, kicking three out of four extra points on April 23, 2007, for the Kansas Koyotes of the indoor American Professional Football League, as a high school senior. She was replaced with a college kicker after her fourth game. Vestal went on to play women's tackle football for the Kansas City Storm, but later became a rugby player.
 Katie Hnida – Placekicker for the Fort Wayne FireHawks of the Continental Indoor Football League (CIFL) in 2010. She played in the first three games of the season, but developed a blood clot in her kicking leg. Hnida went on to become a kicker for the Colorado Cobras in the Colorado Football Conference, and for the KC Mustangs in the Interstate Football League. (See also "College players" below.)
 Julie Harshbarger – First woman to score a field goal in a men's professional football game, as placekicker for the Chicago Cardinals in the CIFL in 2010. Harshbarger was named CIFL Special Teams Player of the Year for 2014, as kicker for the Chicago Blitz, and as the AIF Special Teams Player of the Year for 2015, after the Blitz changed leagues.
 Jennifer Welter – First woman to play in a non-kicking or skill position in a men's professional football league, as running back for the Texas Revolution of the Indoor Football League in 2014. In 2015, Welter became the first female coach in a men's professional football league, after joining the coaching staff of the Revolution. That year, she also became the first female NFL coach as an intern with the Arizona Cardinals, coaching inside linebackers at training camp and during the preseason.

Players in predominantly female football leagues 
Players in traditional ("full pads") tackle football leagues.

1960s and 1970s 
 Marcella Sanborn – Quarterback, Cleveland Daredevils (from 1967), called "the first true 'star' of women's football", playing for the first women's tackle football team. Named Bud Collins's Athlete of the Year for 1967 in The Boston Globe.
 Linda Jefferson – Halfback, Toledo Troopers (1972–1979), seven-time national champions (WPFL, NWFL). One of only four women inducted into the American Football Association Hall of Fame. Named the 1975 Athlete of the Year by womenSports, the first magazine dedicated exclusively to covering women in sports. Posted five consecutive 1,000-yard seasons rushing.
 Barbara Patton (football player)|Barbara Patton – Linebacker, Los Angeles Dandelions (1973–1975). In 1974, Patton was featured in a nationally syndicated newspaper article ("Mom, 32, Tries Football"), as linebacker, PBX operator, and single mother of two children, including her son Marvcus, age 7. Throughout his career as an NFL linebacker, Marvcus Patton went on to frequently mention the influence of his mother Barbara as a former linebacker herself.

21st century

Callie Brownson: Safety/running back, D.C. Divas (2010–2017). Two-time gold medalist for Team USA in the 2013 and 2017 IFAF Women's World Championships. Became the first female assistant football coach in the NCAA's Division I when she was hired by the Dartmouth Big Green football team. Currently an assistant coach of the Cleveland Browns.
Allison Cahill: Quarterback, Boston Renegades (WFA) (2003, 2005–present). First quarterback in history to amass 100 career victories playing exclusively in women's football leagues.
Sami Grisafe: Quarterback, Chicago Force (2007–present). 2013 WFA National Champion and game MVP. Two-time gold medalist for Team USA in the 2010 and 2013 IFAF Women's World Championships. Musician and songwriter.
Anita Marks: Quarterback, Miami Fury (2000–2002), Florida Stingrays (2003). Television and radio sports reporter/commentator. 
Yekaterina Pashkevich: Running back, New Hampshire Freedom (2002–2006) and Boston Rampage (2007). A charter member of Russia's first women's national hockey team. Olympian for Russian Federation women's hockey team (2002, 2006, 2014).
Natalie Randolph: Wide receiver, DC Divas (2004–2008). Became third ever female head coach a boys' high school football team in 2010. Recipient of the Women of Distinction Award from the American Association of University Women in 2011.
Phoebe Schecter: Defensive linebacker and captain of the Great Britain team. In 2015, Schecter led the GB team to the European Championship final against Finland. In 2017, she made headlines as a coaching intern with the Buffalo Bills in the NFL.
Sarah Schkeeper: Offensive guard, New York Sharks, Richmond Black Widows (2009–present). Gold medalist for Team USA 2013 IFAF Women's World Championship. Founder of Richmond Black Widows football club.
Katie Sowers: Eight-year player in the Women's Football Alliance and gold medalist for Team USA at the 2013 IFAF Women's World Championship. Later became the second female coach in NFL history, and the first to coach in a Super Bowl.
Lei'D Tapa: Linebacker, Carolina Queens (2007–2009). Professional wrestler and model.
Donna Wilkinson: Running back/tight end, D.C. Divas (2001–present), Los Angeles Amazons (2000). In 2003, became first woman in modern era to rush for over 1,000 yards in an eight-game regular season. Two-time gold medalist for Team USA (2010, 2013).
Alissa Wykes: Running back, Philadelphia Liberty Belles. NWFA MVP in 2001. Came out as a lesbian in December/January 2002 edition of Sports Illustrated for Women.
Whitney Zelee: Running back, Boston Militia/Renegades (2011–present). In 2013, eclipsed the 2,000-yard benchmark and set a new record of 2,128 rushing yards over an eight-game season, earning her conference MVP honors. Holds WFA record for most touchdowns in one game (8 vs D.C. Divas on May 18, 2013). Two-time WFA National Champion and game MVP (2011, 2014).

College players 
Almost all of the women who have played on predominantly male college and professional football teams have done so by playing either the placekicker or holder positions. Both positions are rarely involved in the full contact present in American football.

Placekickers 
 Liz Heaston – First woman to play and score in a college football game, kicking two extra points on October 18, 1997, as a placekicker with the Willamette Bearcats in the NAIA. A star soccer player, Heaston had been recruited as a replacement for the injured starting kicker, and had trained with the team for three weeks; she played in only one other football game for Willamette.
 Ashley Martin – Second female athlete to score in a college football game, and the first to score in an NCAA Division I game on August 30, 2001, as a placekicker for Jacksonville State University. She kicked three extra points in a game against Cumberland University; JSU was then in Division I-AA, which later became known as FCS.
 Katie Hnida – First woman to score in an NCAA Division I-A football game on August 30, 2003, as a placekicker for the University of New Mexico, kicking two points against Texas State University. Also the first woman to appear in a bowl game, at the 2002 Las Vegas Bowl against UCLA, during which her extra point attempt was blocked. (See also "Players in predominantly male football leagues" above.)
 Tonya Butler – First woman to score a field goal in an NCAA game on September 27, 2003, while playing for the University of West Alabama Tigers in Division II as a graduate student. By 2004, Butler had scored 87 career points, setting an NCAA record for a female kicker.
 Brittany Ryan – Scored 100 career points as placekicker for Lebanon Valley College of NCAA Division III in 2010, breaking Tonya Butler's record for most career points scored by a female player in the NCAA.
 Sarah Fuller – First woman to play in a Power Five football game on November 28, 2020, after taking the opening kickoff of the second half for the Vanderbilt Commodores football team who were playing Missouri. Fuller was a starting goalkeeper on the Vanderbilt women's soccer team, who had won the SEC Championship title the previous weekend; she tried out for the men's football team on the Monday before the game, because they were short of specialists due to COVID-19 testing, and needed a kicker. On December 12, 2020, Fuller became the first woman to score a point in a Power Five football game, after kicking an extra point in a Vanderbilt game against Tennessee. 
 April Goss: Former college football placekicker at Kent State University.
 KaLena "Beanie" Barnes: Former punter, and first woman to play on a top ten ranked Division I-A team, for the University of Nebraska.

Other positions 
 Toni Harris – First woman to be offered a full college football scholarship, playing in a full-contact skill position. By the end of her community college career as free safety for East Los Angeles Community College, Harris had received scholarship offers from six universities, and finally signed with Central Methodist University, an NAIA school. Harris was also the first female football player in a television ad aired during the Super Bowl, appearing in a commercial for Toyota during Super Bowl LIII in February 2019. In February 2020, Harris appeared in an "NFL 100" commercial at the opening of Super Bowl LIV.
 Shelby Osborne: Became the first female to play a non-kicking position at a four-year college after signing in summer 2014 to play cornerback at Campbellsville University, an NAIA school.
 Sam Gordon: Running back, Salt Lake City. Her play in a youth football league led to her becoming the first female football player featured on a Wheaties box.
 Reina Iizuka: First woman to appear on a U Sports (Canadian) football roster; DB/LB for the University of Manitoba.

High school players

Pre-2000 
 Luverne "Toad" Wise – First female player to score in an American football game, as a kicker for the Atmore (now Escambia County) Alabama High School Blue Devils in 1939; also played in 1940.
 Frankie Groves – The first female to play on a boys' high school varsity team in the state of Texas, she played right tackle for Stinnett High School in 1947.
 Theresa Dion – First female player on a boys' high school varsity team in the state of Florida, when she played as a placekicker for Immaculate High School in Key West, Florida, in 1972. Dion has been referred to as the first female player on a boys' high school varsity team (in any sport).
 Tami Maida – First known quarterback to also a become homecoming princess, as a 14-year-old junior varsity quarterback at Philomath High School in Philomath, Oregon, in 1981. Her story was the basis of the CBS movie Quarterback Princess starring Helen Hunt as Maida. She is Canadian.
 Beth Bates –  First female player in Kentucky to score in a high school football game, kicking five extra points for the Williamsburg Yellow Jackets during her junior year in 1982. Her historic first extra point was covered in The New York Times and Sports Illustrated. She became the first female player to score a field goal in Kentucky during her senior year, when she connected on a 22-yarder.
 Heather Darrow – First female athlete in the state of Tennessee to score a point in a high school football game, when she kicked a PAT in the season opener as a junior at Notre Dame High in 1986.

Kathleen Trumbo – First female in the state of Indiana to earn a varsity letter in football, as a defensive tackle at Corydon Central High School in 1989. Although other girls in Indiana had started the season on boys' football teams, only Trumbo is believed to have finished.
Sabrina Wells – One of the first two female players in the WPIAL (Western Pennsylvania Interscholastic Athletic League), who played as a tight end for Ballou High School in Washington, DC, in 1989. Featured in Jet magazine with Lakeal Ellis.

Lakeal Ellis – One of the first two female players in the WPIAL (Western Pennsylvania Interscholastic Athletic League), who played as a defensive back for Roosevelt High School in Washington, DC, in 1989. Featured in Jet magazine with Sabrina Wells.
Jessica Schultz – First female in Tennessee to score a touchdown in a varsity football game, as a sophomore running back at Jellico High in 1998. The touchdown on the home field of border rival Williamsburg High in Kentucky was viewed as "revenge" for the widely publicized extra point scored by Beth Bates 16 years prior.
Tonya Fletcher – One of the very few female players in the state of Illinois to have tried and succeeded in playing high school football as of 1998, along with Tina Brooks of Wauconda High. Fletcher was a kicker for Cary Grove High School, who was named homecoming queen in 1998, and was featured in Mary-Kate and Ashley Magazine in 2001.

Post-2000 
 Holley Mangold – In 2007, played high school football as an offensive lineman; younger sister of NFL offensive lineman Nick Mangold. She also competed as a weightlifter in the 2012 Summer Olympics
 Erin DiMeglio – In 2012, became the first female quarterback to see play in Florida high school football history
 Becca Longo – Kicker who in 2017 became the first woman to earn a college football scholarship to an NCAA school at the Division II level or higher and signed a letter of intent with Adams State University.
 Anna Zerilli – Started kicking for Manchester-Essex High School, MA in 2015 and was the starting Varsity kicker for them. First female football player in North Shore and Cape Ann History and first female freshman to score in a Varsity game in American history. Currently playing Varsity football at Proctor Academy in New Hampshire. First New England female to sign to play college football. And will be kicking at Lake Forest College in Illinois next fall. Kicker at Lake Forest College. First female to play on male football team in school history. Became first to play in the conference and first female to play college football in the Midwest.
 Mika Makekau: In 2008, as a placekicker for Iolani School in Honolulu, Hawaii, Makekau set the state record for longest field goal (44 yards) by a female kicker. Later became a college football placekicker at the University of La Verne, making a 26-yard field goal against No. 11 Whitworth on September 7, 2019.

See also
 Women's American football
 List of female American football teams

References

External links
 Independent Women's Football League official website
 Women's Football Alliance official website
 Women's Spring Football League official website
 Lingerie Football League official website

 

Football
Female American football players
Lists of sportswomen